Kevermes is a village in Békés County, in the Southern Great Plain region of south-east Hungary.

Geography
It covers an area of 43.36 km² and has a population of 2,049 people (2015).

References

External links

  in Hungarian

Populated places in Békés County